In Canada, the term non-status Indian refers to any First Nations person who for whatever reason is not registered with the federal government, or is not registered to a band which signed a treaty with the Crown.

For several decades, status Indian women automatically became non-status if they married men who were not status Indians.

Prior to 1955, a status Indian could lose their status and become non-status through enfranchisement (voluntarily giving up status, usually for a minimal cash payment), by obtaining a college degree or becoming an ordained minister.

The 2013 Federal Court case Daniels v. Canada established that non-status Indians (and Métis) have the same aboriginal rights as status Indians, in that they are encompassed in the 1867 Constitution Act's language about "Indians". However, the 2014 Federal Court of Appeal decision "Daniels v Canada" overturned that verdict after the government appealed. In 2016, the Supreme Court of Canada upheld the 2013 verdict after a subsequent appeal on the 2014 decision. As a result, the federal government has jurisdiction and fiduciary duty over status Indians, non-status Indians, and Métis alike.

See also
Urban Indian
Treaty Indian
Detraditionalization
Detribalization
Tribal disenrollment

References

First Nations history
Canadian Aboriginal and indigenous law
Assimilation of indigenous peoples of North America

Indigenous rights in Canada